James F. Nolan (November 29, 1915 – July 29, 1985) was an American film, stage and television actor.

Nolan was born in San Francisco, California. After serving in World War II he began his acting career in New York, performing in stage plays such as A Streetcar Named Desire and Bus Stop. Nolan then moved to Hollywood, California.

Nolan guest-starred in numerous television programs including Gunsmoke, The Adventures of Ozzie and Harriet, The Fugitive, Get Smart, Harbor Command, The Wild Wild West, McHale's Navy, Leave It to Beaver, Emergency!, The Jack Benny Program, The Waltons, The Twilight Zone, Perry Mason, Adam-12 and The Mary Tyler Moore Show. He also appeared in films, including Charley Varrick, Support Your Local Gunfighter, Dirty Harry, All Night Long, The Toolbox Murders and The Shootist. He played the role of the priest Father Steven Lonigan in the 1970 film Airport.

Nolan died in July 1985 of cancer at the Motion Picture & Television Fund cottages in Woodland Hills, California, at the age of 69.

Selected filmography 

Torchy Blane in Panama (1938) - Ship's Officer Nelson
Little Miss Thoroughbred (1938) - First Intern at General Hospital
When Were You Born (1938) - Ship Passenger (uncredited)
Cowboy from Brooklyn (1938) - Alvey's Secretary (uncredited)
Racket Busters (1938) - Jim Smith - Allison's Secretary (uncredited)
Boy Meets Girl (1938) - Young Man Brought in for Susie (uncredited)
Garden of the Moon (1938) - Sound Man with Microphone (uncredited)
Girls on Probation (1938) - Dave Warren - Connie's Date (uncredited)
Winged Victory (1944) - Stranger on Street (uncredited)
Because of Him (1946) - Reporter (uncredited)
Little Miss Big (1946) - Detective Lieutenant (uncredited)
The Brute Man (1946) - Police Dispatcher (uncredited)
Lady in the Lake (1946) - Party Guest (uncredited)
Abie's Irish Rose (1946) - Policeman
Alias Mr. Twilight (1946) - Customs Guard (uncredited)
The Beginning or the End (1947) - President Roosevelt's Bodyguard (uncredited)
Dark Delusion (1947) - Orderly (uncredited)
Unconquered (1947) - Villager (uncredited)
Dick Tracy Meets Gruesome (1947) - Dan Sterne
The Miracle of the Bells (1948) - Tod Jones
Berlin Express (1948) - ROT Captain on First Train (uncredited)
Fighting Father Dunne (1948) - Policeman Danny Briggs
The Arizona Ranger (1948) - Nimino Welch
Guns of Hate (1948) - Sheriff Bradley
Race Street (1948) - Herbie
They Live by Night (1948) - Schreiber
Sons of Adventure (1948) - Frank - Publicity Man (uncredited)
Night Time in Nevada (1948) - Jim Andrews
Son of God's Country (1948) - Bill Sanger
Rogues' Regiment (1948) - American Colonel
He Walked by Night (1948) - Harry (uncredited)
The Countess of Monte Cristo (1948) - Lieutenant (uncredited)
One Sunday Afternoon (1948) - Henry (uncredited)
Wake of the Red Witch (1948) - First Diver (uncredited)
The Lucky Stiff (1949)
Siren of Atlantis (1949) - Major
Daughter of the Jungle (1949) - Lamser
The Clay Pigeon (1949) - Faber (uncredited)
Outpost in Morocco (1949) - Legionnaire Colonel's Aide (uncredited)
Death Valley Gunfighter (1949) - Shad
The Stratton Story (1949) - Reporter (uncredited)
The Window (1949) - Stranger on Street (uncredited)
Illegal Entry (1949) - Agent Benson
Too Late for Tears (1949) - Detective Parker (uncredited)
Bandit King of Texas (1949) - Dan McCabe
Thieves' Highway (1949) - Smaller Cop at Roadside Bar (uncredited)
Flame of Youth (1949) - Policeman (uncredited)
Strange Bargain (1949) - Policeman (uncredited)
The Woman on Pier 13 (1949) - Policeman (uncredited)
Alias the Champ (1949) - Al Merlo
Rusty's Birthday (1949) - Motor Officer (uncredited)
Mary Ryan, Detective (1949) - Detective Johnson (uncredited)
Adam's Rib (1949) - Dave (uncredited)
Port of New York (1949) - Charles Lindsay (uncredited)
Paid in Full (1950) - Charlie Malloy - Lawyer (uncredited)
Riding High (1950) - Deputy (uncredited)
Double Dynamite (1951) - Detective (uncredited)
The Boss (1956) - Matt's Lawyer (uncredited)
The Big Caper (1957) - Police Sgt. Waldo Harris (uncredited)
The Big Circus (1959) - Police Lieutenant (uncredited)
Portrait in Black (1960) - Detective
An American Dream (1966) - Monsignor Jim (uncredited)
Madigan (1968) - Detective (uncredited)
Airport (1970) - Father Steven Lonigan
Support Your Local Gunfighter (1971) - Train Conductor (uncredited)
Dirty Harry (1971) - Liquor Proprietor
Charley Varrick (1973) - Clerk
The Shootist (1976) - Gambler (uncredited)
Telefon (1977) - Appliance Store Clerk
The Toolbox Murders (1978) - Bartender
All Night Long (1981) - Grandfather Gibbons
Jinxed! (1982) - Father

References

External links 

Rotten Tomatoes profile

1915 births
1985 deaths
People from San Francisco
Male actors from San Francisco
American male film actors
American male television actors
American male stage actors
20th-century American male actors